Sawgrass Lake is a lake in Brevard County, Florida, United States. It is one of the lakes that form the St. Johns River. The lake is usually accessed by boat from a ramp located on U.S. Route 192 on the west shore of the St. Johns River. The lake is located near the river's headwaters, and the size of the lake is limited by the low velocity of the river at this point. It is only  in diameter with a surface area of less than 1,000 acres (4 km2). Governed by the St. Johns Water Management District.

Little Sawgrass Lake
The westernmost point is slightly west of the bigger lake. It also has a surface area under 1,000 acres (4 km2), and is almost  in diameter.

See also
U.S. Route 192
Palm Bay
Lake Washington-next lake downriver
Lake Hell 'n Blazes-next lake upriver

References 

Lakes of Florida
St. Johns River
Lakes of Brevard County, Florida